Erkki Tapani Lehtonen (born January 9, 1957 in Tampere, Finland) is a retired professional ice hockey player who played for Tappara in the SM-liiga.  He was inducted into the Finnish Hockey Hall of Fame in 1997 and his jersey was retired by Tappara in 2018. He also won a silver medal at the 1988 Winter Olympics. Lehtonen scored the winning goal to help Finland win their first medal.

Career statistics

Regular season and playoffs

International

References

External links
 Finnish Hockey Hall of Fame bio

1957 births
Living people
Bellingham Blazers players
Finnish expatriate ice hockey players in Germany
Finnish expatriate ice hockey players in the United States
Finnish ice hockey players
Ice hockey players at the 1988 Winter Olympics
Olympic ice hockey players of Finland
Olympic medalists in ice hockey
Olympic silver medalists for Finland
Ice hockey people from Tampere
Tappara players